John Wilks Hoffman (December 8, 1925April 15, 1987) was an American football running back in the National Football League for the Chicago Bears.

He made the NFL Pro Bowl in 1954 and 1956. Hoffman was a Little Rock High School all-state football player in 1943–44 and All-State in basketball in 1944–45. He won four track events in the state meet in 1945. He joined the Bears in 1949, rushing for 1,366 yards and catching 135 passes in eight years. Hoffman retired at age 30 and became the England High School football coach.

1925 births
1987 deaths
Sportspeople from Little Rock, Arkansas
Players of American football from Arkansas
American football running backs
Arkansas Razorbacks football players
Chicago Bears players
Little Rock Central High School alumni
Western Conference Pro Bowl players
Arkansas Razorbacks men's track and field athletes